Keolis Norge is the Norwegian subsidiary of Keolis, holding the contract to operate the Bergen Light Rail and the Bergen Sentrum bus contract for Skyss.

History
The company was established in 2008 as Fjord1 Partner AS, a joint venture between Fjord1 Nordvestlandske (49%) and Keolis Nordic AB (51%), a Keolis holding company for its Nordic operations, with the goal of bidding for the Bergen Light Rail contract and other PSO contracts for bus transport in the Bergen area.

The contract was announced on 2 April 2009, after Fjord1 Partner had beaten NSB, Tide Bane (Tide with HTM Personenvervoer) and Veolia Transport Bane for the contract. The infrastructure and the Variobahn vehicles are owned by Vestland Fylkeskommune, while the operation subsidies are managed by Skyss, a county agency responsible for all public transport subsidies in Vestland.

In 2014, Fjord1 sold their shares to Keolis, and the company changed its name to Keolis Norge AS.

In June 2019, the company was awarded the tender for driving buses in the route area Bergen Sentrum, starting on 1 December 2020. This includes driving amongst other vehicles 112 electric buses, of which 102 battery buses from Yutong and ten trolley buses from Solaris.

On September 6th 2022 DSD AS, the owner of Tide Buss announced they would buy out all shares and take over the running of all their contracts, leaving Keolis Norge defunct.

References

Bergen Light Rail
Railway companies of Norway
Fjord1
Keolis
Norwegian companies established in 2008
Railway companies established in 2008